Capitán Sarmiento Partido is a  partido of Buenos Aires Province in Argentina.

The city of Capitán Sarmiento gradually built up around a railway station between San Antonio de Areco and Pergamino. The railway station was named in honour of Domingo Fidel Sarmiento, (adopted son of Domingo Faustino Sarmiento), who died in the Battle of Curupaytí in the Paraguayan War. The town and eventually the partido became known by the same name as the train station.

Settlements
Capitán Sarmiento
La Luisa

External links
 Official website
 unofficial Capitán Sarmiento website

Populated places established in 1961
Partidos of Buenos Aires Province